The 2008 UAE 3rd Speedcar Series round was the first round of the 2008–09 Speedcar Series. It was held on 5 and 6 December 2008 at Dubai Autodrome in Dubai, United Arab Emirates. The race supported the 2008 UAE 3rd GP2 Asia Series round.

Classification

Qualifying

Race 1

Race 2 
The race 2 was cancelled due to flooding due to heavy rainfall.

See also 
 2008 UAE 3rd GP2 Asia Series round

References

Speedcar Series
Speedcar